Ambala Chandigarh Expressway is four-lane 35 km long, high-traffic density corridor of Ambala-Chandigarh section (km 5.735 to km 39.960 on NH-152 and 0 km to 0.871 km on NH 5) on BOT basis, was completed in 30 months at a cost of  The expressway has been operational since December 2009 and was constructed by the GMR Group with assistance from the World Bank.

38 km south of Ambala at existing NH152 (Ambala-Pehowa-Narwana-Fatehabad-Sirsa), it connects with under-construction controlled access tolled Ambala–Narnaul Expressway (Trans-Haryana Expressway).

See also
 Ambala-Jagadhri highway
 National Highway 22, which this Expressway has been part of
 Expressways & highways in Haryana

References

Expressways in Haryana
Transport in Chandigarh
Transport in Ambala
Expressways in Punjab, India